Lou Ann Linehan (born September 16, 1955) is an American politician who serves in the Nebraska Legislature representing the 39th district.  She was first elected to the legislature in 2016, and is the chairwoman of the Revenue Committee.

References

\

1955 births
21st-century American women politicians
21st-century American politicians
Living people
Republican Party Nebraska state senators
Women state legislators in Nebraska
People from Beatrice, Nebraska